Atanque, also known as Atanques or Kankuamo, is an extinct Chibchan language of Colombia, once spoken in the area of Sierra Nevada de Santa Marta.

Vocabulary
There is very little information about the language, in particular with regard to grammar. Before its speakers switched to Spanish, Celedón (1892) managed to compile a brief dictionary. The following table shows a sample of the lexicon.

Dispite being so poorly attested, Atanque clearly belongs to Arwako subgroup of Chibcha. In particular, it appears to be very close to Wiwa in terms of phonetic innovations.

Toponyms
Traces of Atanque are also preserved in toponyms recorded in the region of Sierra Nevada. Suffixes like -ka "place, site" (e.g. in Susungá-ka, Chingá-ka, Kankuá-ka) or -kua "bower" (e.g. in Birintu-kua, Risátu-kua, Kamíntu-kua) are diagnostic of an Atanque source.

Notes

References
 
 
 
 

Languages of Colombia
Chibchan languages
Extinct languages of South America